Donald Hamilton Fraser RA (30 July 1929, London – 2 September 2009), is famed for his abstract landscape paintings.

Training and education
As an adolescent, Fraser attended the Maidenhead Grammar School in Berkshire, England. In the late 1940s, he worked at the Sunday Times as an editorial trainee while completing his National Service. From 1949 to 1952, Fraser trained at London's Saint Martin's School of Art together with contemporaries including Frank Auerbach, Sandra Blow, Sheila Fell, Leon Kossoff, Jack Smith, and Joe Tilson.

Career
Anthony Blunt and John Piper were among assessors that awarded Hamilton Fraser a one-year French government scholarship in Paris in 1953. Also in 1953, his premier solo exhibition was given at Gimpel Fils, London.  In 1955, Fraser returned to England and for 18 months extended his artist incoming by writing for Arts Review. Between 1953 and 1971 he had nine shows at Gimpel Filts, in 1967 at the Zurich-based Gimpel-Hanover Galerie, and Fraser even got  eleven shows between 1958 and 1978 at the well known New York gallery, Paul Rosenberg. Carel Weight hired Fraser as a tutor at the Royal College of Art in 1958 where he continued until 1983 with fellow teachers Peter Blake and Julian Trevelyan. Fraser's students at the Royal included Patrick Caulfield, David Hockney, Ron B. Kitaj, and Thérèse Oulton.

Art style and approach

Fraser's painting style was compared to that of Nicolas de Staël and characterized in the way he layered thick bright paint with a palette knife to produce a collage-like effect. The landscapes were still clearly identifiable while nonetheless forming abstract and almost dream-like fields of color. Fraser also made chalk and wash drawing of dancers that contrasted in style with his paintings and highlighted his diverse talents.

Fraser said “An artist doesn't really choose what sort of pictures he paints. He paints what is there inside him. It is a sort of imperative.”

Honors and distinctions
Fraser was elected a fellow at the Royal College of Art in 1970, becoming an Honorary Fellow in 1984. At the Royal Academy of Arts, he was also made an associate RA in 1975 and a full Royal Academician (RA) in 1985. Also at the Royal Academy, he was an Honorary Curator between 1992 and 1999, a Trustee between 1994 and 2000. From 1986 through 2000 he was a member of the Royal Fine Art Commission. He was on the council of the Artists' General Benevolent Fund starting in 1981 (as chairmen a few times in the 1980s). He was Vice-President of the Royal Overseas League beginning in 1986.

In 1983 Fraser designed four commemorative stamps for England celebrating 14 March as Commonwealth Day for the Commonwealth of Nations.

Fraser's work has been offered for sale in advertisements of The New York Times in 1985 and 1997.

Personal life
Fraser was very tall.

Fraser met Judith Wentworth-Shields when he attended St Martin's. They married in 1954 at the British Embassy in Paris. Together they had one daughter.

Fraser also wrote as a ballet critic.

At the time of his death, Fraser had lived with his wife in pair of converted cottages at Henley-on-Thames since 1969.

Writings
 Gauguin's 'Vision after the Sermon'; Cassell, 1969
 Dancers: ballet paintings and drawings; Phaidon Press, London 1989

References

External links
 
 Pictures of the four stamps designed by Fraser
 Exhibition: Bohun Gallery regularly holds solo shows
 Donald Hamilton Fraser Biography and Links on artnet
 Picture of Fraser and brief bio

1929 births
2009 deaths
Academics of the Royal College of Art
Alumni of Saint Martin's School of Art
20th-century British painters
British male painters
21st-century British painters
Royal Academicians
20th-century British male artists
21st-century British male artists